Many United States presidents have borne a coat of arms; largely through inheritance, assumption, or grants from foreign heraldic authorities. One, Dwight Eisenhower, received his upon becoming a Knight of the Order of the Elephant of Denmark. The president of the United States, as a position, uses the Seal of the President of the United States as a coat of arms, but this is a coat of arms of office, not a personal coat of arms.

Arms of presidents by century

18th century

19th century

20th century

21st century

Notes

References

External links

 American Heraldry Society
 The Institute of Heraldry, Office of the Administrative Assistant to the Secretary of the Army
 Arms of Famous Americans: Presidents of the United States

Presidents
United States
Coats of arms